Miguel Gómez (born December 17, 1992) is a Dominican professional baseball infielder for the Milwaukee Milkmen of the American Association of Professional Baseball. He has played in Major League Baseball (MLB) for the San Francisco Giants.

Career

San Francisco Giants
Gómez signed with the San Francisco Giants as an international free agent in September 2011. The Giants added him to their 40-man roster after the 2016 season.

Gomez started 2017 with the Richmond Flying Squirrels and was called up on July 7 to the Giants. He made his debut the same day against the Miami Marlins as a pinch hitter, going hitless in his only at bat. He picked up his first major league hit and RBI two days later. He elected free agency on November 2, 2018.

Milwaukee Milkmen
On November 8, 2019, Gómez signed with the Milwaukee Milkmen of the independent American Association. Gómez won the American Association championship with the Milkmen in 2020.

International career
Before the 2019 season, he was selected for Dominican Republic national baseball team at the 2019 Pan American Games Qualifier, and later participated in the 2019 Pan American Games.

References

External links

1992 births
Living people
Augusta GreenJackets players
Baseball players at the 2019 Pan American Games
Dominican Republic expatriate baseball players in the United States
Dominican Republic national baseball team players
Dominican Summer League Giants players
Leones del Escogido players
Major League Baseball players from the Dominican Republic
Major League Baseball second basemen
Richmond Flying Squirrels players
Salem-Keizer Volcanoes players
San Francisco Giants players
San Jose Giants players
Sportspeople from Santo Domingo
Tigres del Licey players
Pan American Games competitors for the Dominican Republic